Natalia Shakhovskaya (September 27, 1935 – May 20, 2017), PAU, was a Soviet and Russian cellist.  She studied cello at the Gnessin School of Music and later at the Moscow Conservatory under the tutorship of Semyon Kozolupov. She finished her education at the aforementioned music conservatory with Mstislav Rostropovich.

Shakovskaya won some of the most important cello competitions in Russia and abroad, including; the First Prize and Gold Medal at the International Tchaikovsky Competition in 1962. Shakhovskaya pursued an active career as a soloist in recitals and with the best orchestras and conductors worldwide.

She taught at the Moscow Conservatory since 1962 (and as Head of the Cello Chair and Director of Double Bass Department from 1974, after Rostropovich relinquished the post upon his departure from Russia).

More than forty of her students have won international competitions, e.g. Truls Mørk. Shakhovskaya gave master classes around the world and was a jury member at international competitions.

She was a principal teacher at the Escuela Superior de Música Reina Sofía (Queen Sofía College of Music) in Madrid.

References

1935 births
2017 deaths
Russian classical cellists
Academic staff of the Reina Sofía School of Music
Russian music educators
Moscow Conservatory alumni
Gnessin State Musical College alumni
Russian women classical cellists
Burials in Troyekurovskoye Cemetery
Women music educators
20th-century classical musicians
20th-century cellists